HLL Lifecare Limited (formerly Hindustan Latex Limited) (HLL) is an Indian healthcare product manufacturing company based in Thiruvananthapuram, Kerala, India.  A Government of India-owned corporation (Public-sector undertaking).

Products 
It produces health care products, including: condoms, contraceptive pills, IUDs, surgical sutures, blood bags and Pharma products. One of HLL's contraceptive products is ormeloxifene, branded as Saheli, the world’s first and only oral non-hormonal, non-steroidal oral contraceptive, taken as a weekly pill. In 2012, HLL announced a polymerase chain reaction based duplex test kit for chikungunya and dengue fever tests in collaboration with the Rajiv Gandhi Centre for Biotechnology, Trivandrum. In December 2015, they have tied up with the Government of India in setting up Amrit pharmacies across India for providing cheaper medicines for Cancer and Cardiovascular disorders. The name Amrit stands for Affordable Medicines and Reliable Implants for Treatment.

History
In 2005, HLL established LifeSpring Hospitals, a 50-50 joint venture with the Acumen Fund, a U.S.-based nonprofit global venture philanthropy fund, to provide low-cost maternity services, starting at Hyderabad. Today it has nine hospitals across Andhra Pradesh state.

In February 2014, HLL acquired 74% Equity in Goa Antibiotics and Pharmaceuticals Ltd.

HLL has its head office in Thiruvananthapuram and factories in 7 locations across India. Four of the factories were built in Kerala, such as  Peroorkada, Aakkulam, Kakkanad and Irapuram. The rest 3 factories are in Belgaum, Manesar, and Indore.

HLL currently has 220 pathology labs, 47 imaging centres and 6 labs under the brand name Hindlabs. It runs a total of 253 pharmacies across India. HLL runs a subsidiary with the name of HLL Infra Tech Services Ltd. In 2020-21 the company reported a turnover of ₹5,081 crore.

In 2022 due to growing cases of stroke, the cabinet gave permission to have a collaboration with HLL Lifecare to build a hub and spoke model at various primary health centres (PHCs) for the required treatment.

HLL Divestment Bid 
On 8 January 2018, the Government of India approved the privatisation of HLL Lifecare. But the Ministry of Health and Family Welfare and the Government of Kerala has opposed the Union Government's plan for disinvestment of HLL Lifecare Limited.
In 2021, the Central Government eventually finalized its plans to divest its whole stake in the company which will make it a private company.
The Finance Ministry’s Department of Investment and Public Asset Management (DIPAM) on November 14, 2021 revealed a large portion of the company's business comes from central government projects.

See also
Ormeloxifene
Economy of Thiruvananthapuram
Moods Condoms

References

External links
 HLL Lifecare Limited
 HLFPPT

Companies based in Thiruvananthapuram
Health care companies of India
Government-owned companies of India
Indian companies established in 1966
Indian brands
Health in Kerala
Condoms
1966 establishments in Kerala